Solid State Records was a jazz record label formed in 1966 by producers Sonny Lester and Phil Ramone, with arranger Manny Albam.

The label released original recordings in the mid to late 1960s by Joe Williams, Chick Corea, Jimmy McGriff, Dizzy Gillespie, the Thad Jones/Mel Lewis Jazz Orchestra and many others before its jazz artists were consolidated under United Artists' Blue Note label.

Discography

Albums

References

External links
 

American record labels
Jazz record labels
American jazz record labels
Record labels established in 1966